The Soviet Union (USSR) competed at the 1960 Winter Olympics in Squaw Valley, United States.

Medalists

Alpine skiing 

Women

Biathlon 

Men

Cross-country skiing 

Men

Women

Figure skating

Ice hockey 

Men
Head coach:  Anatoli Tarasov

Preliminary round

Final round

Nordic combined

Ski jumping

Speed skating

Men

Women

References

Official Olympic Reports
International Olympic Committee results database

Nations at the 1960 Winter Olympics
1960
Winter Olympics